is a Japanese politician of the Liberal Democratic Party, a member of the House of Representatives in the Diet (national legislature). A native of Sayama, Saitama and high school graduate, he was elected to the assembly of Saitama Prefecture in 1979 where he served for two terms, and then to be the mayor of his hometown Sayama in 1986, serving for two terms. He was elected to the House of Representatives for the first time in 1996.

References

External links 
  in Japanese.

1936 births
Living people
Politicians from Saitama Prefecture
Mayors of places in Saitama Prefecture
Members of the House of Representatives (Japan)
Liberal Democratic Party (Japan) politicians
21st-century Japanese politicians